Territorial Council elections were held in the French Territory of the Afars and the Issas on 18 November 1973. The result was a victory for the "Majority" group of candidates, who were supportive of the government of Ali Aref Bourhan and mainly Afars. The other two groupings of candidates were "Moderation Opposition", who supported opposition leader Hassan Gouled Aptidon (mostly Issas and Somalis), and other opposition groups. Voter turnout was 75.6%.

Results

References

1973 in Afars and Issas
Elections in Djibouti
Afars
Legislative election, 1973
November 1973 events in Africa